Ambar is a village in the Tunceli District, Tunceli Province, Turkey. The village is populated by Kurds of the Alan tribe and had a population of 41 in 2021.

The hamlets of Aşağıgözlü, Kurucu and Özlüce are attached to the village.

References 

Kurdish settlements in Tunceli Province
Villages in Tunceli District